Tadeusz Błachno (born 11 March 1953 in Poland) is a Polish retired footballer.

References

Polish footballers
Living people
1953 births
Association football midfielders
Poland international footballers
Legia Warsaw players
MKS Cracovia (football) players